Louis Lincoln Emmerson (December 27, 1863 – February 4, 1941) was an American Republican politician and the twenty-seventh governor of Illinois.

Family 
Louis was born on December 27, 1863, in Albion, Illinois, and is the son of Jesse and Fannie Emerson.

In 1887 Louis married his wife, Ann Mathews, who was the daughter of Thomas Matthews.

Early life 
After completing his education in the Albion public school system, Emmerson moved to Mount Vernon, Illinois, in 1883, and established a career in the mercantile business. He also was influential in the organization of the Mount Vernon Third National Bank, which occurred in 1901.

Political career 
Emmerson entered politics in 1912, as an unsuccessful candidate for state treasurer. However, four years later, he was victorious in his election for secretary of state, an office he held for twelve years.

Governor 
Emmerson won the 1928 Republican gubernatorial nomination by a margin of 63% to 37% over the incumbent governor, the corrupt Len Small, and was sworn into the governorship on January 14, 1929.

During his tenure, he faced mounting difficulties resulting from the Great Depression. Taxpayers were granted some relief when legislation was adopted that eased penalties on overdue taxes and allowed for the issuance of emergency bonds. Also, a motor fuel-tax was instituted and used for improvements in the highway system, the first unemployment commission was initiated, and federal grants were sanctioned for the completion of the Lakes-to-the-Gulf Waterway. Emmerson did not seek reelection and left office on January 9, 1933, retiring from politics. Governor Louis L. Emmerson died on February 4, 1941, and was buried at the Oakwood Cemetery in Mt. Vernon, Illinois.

Freemasonry 
in 1891 Louis was made master mason of the Mt. Vernon masonic lodge.

References

External links 
 Campaigns
 

1863 births
1941 deaths
People from Albion, Illinois
Republican Party governors of Illinois
Secretaries of State of Illinois